The Ropes Creek railway station was the terminus station of the Ropes Creek line, in Sydney, New South Wales, opening on 29 June 1942, after the line was extended past Dunheved to serve the  St Marys Munitions factory. It was named after Ropes Creek, a waterway nearby. The station consisted of an island platform, a waiting room, and a footbridge for public access. It closed along with the line on 22 March 1986.

After the station building was destroyed by fire in June 2011, the site was redeveloped as cultural park with the platform retained.

References

Disused railway stations in Sydney
Railway stations in Australia opened in 1942
Railway stations closed in 1986
1986 disestablishments in Australia